Clinical Chemistry is a peer-reviewed medical journal covering the field of clinical chemistry. It is the official journal of the  American Association for Clinical Chemistry. The journal was first published in 1955 on a bi-monthly basis "to raise the level at which chemistry is practiced in the clinical laboratory"; monthly publication commenced in 1964.  The editor-in-chief is Nader Rifai (Harvard Medical School).

Abstracting and indexing 
The journal is abstracted and indexed in PubMed/MEDLINE and the Science Citation Index. According to the Journal Citation Reports, the journal has a 2020 impact factor of 8.327.

References

External links 
 

Publications established in 1955
Chemistry journals
Monthly journals
English-language journals
1955 establishments in the United States